The Barbour family is a prominent American political family of Scottish origin from Virginia. The progenitor of the Barbour family was James Barbour, who emigrated to Virginia from Scotland in the middle of the 17th-century.

Notable members
The Barbour family's more notable members included James Barbour (10 June 1775–7 June 1842), United States Senator, 18th Governor of Virginia, and 11th United States Secretary of War; John Strode Barbour, Sr. (8 August 1790–12 January 1855), Member of the U.S. House of Representatives from Virginia's 15th congressional district; John Strode Barbour, Jr. (29 December 1820–14 May 1892), Member of the U.S. House of Representatives from Virginia's 8th congressional district and United States Senator; and Philip P. Barbour (25 May 1783–25 February 1841), Member of the U.S. House of Representatives from Virginia's 11th congressional district, 12th Speaker of the United States House of Representatives, and Associate Justice of the Supreme Court of the United States.

 James Barbour I (born 1681) m. Elizabeth Taliaferro
 James Barbour II (1707–1775) m. Elizabeth Todd (1730), m. Sarah Todd (1733)
 Richard Barbour
 James Barbour III (1734–1804) m. Frances Throckmorton (1762)
 Mordecai Barbour (1764–1846) m. Elizabeth Strode, m. Sally Haskell Byrne
 John Strode Barbour (1790–1855) m. Elizabeth A. Byrne
 John Strode Barbour, Jr. (1820–1892) m. Susan Sewell Daingerfield (1865)
 James Barbour (1828–1895) m. Fanny Thomas Beckham (1857)
 Ella B. Barbour Rixey (born 1858) m. John Franklin Rixey (1881)
 Mary B. Barbour Wallace (born 1860) m. Clarence B. Wallace (1890)
 James Byrne Barbour (1864–1926)
 John Strode Barbour (1866–1952) m. Mary B. Grimsley (1894)
 Edwin Barbour (1868–1902) m. Josie McDonald
 A. Floyd Barbour (born 1868)
 Fanny C. Barbour Beckham (born 1874) m. Benjamin Collins Beckham (1899)
 Alfred Madison Barbour (1829–1866) m. Kate Daniels (1858)
 Frances Barbour Minor m. Henry Minor
 Ann Barbour Gist m. Thomas Gist
 Maria Barbour Tillinghast Hogan m. (?) Tillinghast, m. J. B. Hogan
 Mordecai Barbour
 James Barbour
 Thomas Barbour m. Mary Taylor
 Richard Barbour m. Mary Moore
 Gabriel Barbour
 Philip Barbour m. Lucy Taylor, m. Eliza Hopkins
 Frances Barbour Moore m. John Moore
 Sarah Barbour Harrison m. John (James) Harrison
 Mary Barbour Walker m. David Walker
 Lucy Barbour Baylor m. Wythe Baylor
 Thomas Barbour (1735–1825) m. Mary Pendleton Thomas
 Richard Barbour
 James Barbour (1775–1842) m. Lucy Maria Johnson (1795)
 Lucy Maria Barbour Taliaferro (1797–1843) m. John Seymour Taliaferro (1822)
 Benjamin Johnson Barbour (1800–1820)
 James Barbour (died 1857)
 Benjamin Johnson Barbour (1821–1894) m. Caroline Homassel Watson (1844)
 Frances Cornelia Barbour Collins m. William Handy Collins
 Lucy T. Barbour
 Philip P. Barbour (1783–1841) m. Frances Todd Johnson (1804)
 Edmund Pendleton Barbour (1805–1851)
 Philippa Barbour (1807–1860)
 Elizabeth Barbour Ambler (1808–1857) m. John Jaquelin Ambler (1828)
 Quintus Barbour m. Mary Elizabeth Somerville (1833)
 Frances Todd Barbour Ewing m. D. B. Ewing
 Cornelia Barbour Somerville m. James Somerville
 Philip Barbour
 Jane Barbour
 Philip Pendleton Barbour
 Sextus Barbour (1813–1848)
 Septimus Barbour (1815–1816)
 Thomas Barbour (1810–1849)
 Nelly Barbour
 Mary Thomas Bryan m. Daniel Bryan
 Mariana Bryan Lathrop (1820–1893) m. Jedediah Hyde Lathrop
Bryan Lathrop (1844–1916)
Barbour Lathrop (1847–1927)
Caroline Huntington Lathrop (1853–1854)
Minna Byrd Lathrop (1857–1877)
Florence Lathrop Field Page (1858–1921) m. Henry Field (1883) m. Thomas Nelson Page (1893)
 Mary Caroline Wylie (1825—1896) m. Andrew Wylie
 Andrew Wylie (1847—1858)
 Pendleton Wylie (1858–1869)
 Horace Wylie (1868–1950)
 Andrew S. Wylie (1870–1871)
Thomas Barbour Bryan (1828–1906) m. Jennie Byrd Bryan (1850)
Daniel Page Bryan (????-1855) 
Charles Page Bryan (1855–1918)
Jennie Byrd Bryan Payne (1857—1919) m. John Barton Payne (1913)
 Sally Barbour
 Philip Barbour m. (?)
 (?) Barbour
 Ambrose Barbour (born c. 1733) m. Catherine Thomas
 Philip Barbour
 James Barbour m. Letitia Green
 Catherine Barbour Vick m. J. Wesley Vick
 Lucinda Barbour Hardin m. Benjamin Hardin
 Richard Barbour
 Lucy Barbour Davis m. (?) Davis
 William Barbour
 Mary Barbour Harrison m. John Harrison
 Fanny Barbour Smith m. (?) Smith
 Betty Barbour Johnson m. Benjamin Johnson
 Lucy Johnson Barbour m. James Barbour (1795)
 Frances Todd Johnson Barbour m. Philip P. Barbour
 (?) Barbour Boyd m. James Boyd

References

 
Political families of the United States
American families of Scottish ancestry
Scottish families
Families from Virginia